Nautilocalyx is a genus of plants in the family Gesneriaceae.
Its native range stretches from Costa Rica to southern Tropical America and to Trinidad. It is also found in Bolivia, Brazil, Colombia, Costa Rica, Ecuador, French Guiana, Guyana, Panamá, Peru, Suriname, Trinidad-Tobago and Venezuela.

Species
Plants of the World Online (Kew) accepts 41 species;
 Nautilocalyx adenosiphon (Leeuwenb.) Wiehler
 Nautilocalyx aeneus (Linden & André) Wiehler
 Nautilocalyx arenarius L.E.Skog & Steyerm.
 Nautilocalyx bicolor (Hook.) Wiehler
 Nautilocalyx biserrulatus Kriebel
 Nautilocalyx bracteatus (Planch.) Sprague
 Nautilocalyx bryogeton (Leeuwenb.) Wiehler
 Nautilocalyx bullatus (Lem.) Sprague
 Nautilocalyx cataractarum Wiehler
 Nautilocalyx chimantensis L.E.Skog & Steyerm.
 Nautilocalyx coccineus Feuillet & L.E. Skog
 Nautilocalyx colombianus Wiehler
 Nautilocalyx colonensis Wiehler
 Nautilocalyx cordatus (Gleason) L.E.Skog
 Nautilocalyx decumbens (Mart.) Wiehler
 Nautilocalyx dressleri Wiehler
 Nautilocalyx ecuadoranus Wiehler
 Nautilocalyx fasciculatus L.E.Skog & Steyerm.
 Nautilocalyx forgetii (Sprague) Sprague
 Nautilocalyx glandulifer Wiehler
 Nautilocalyx hirsutus (Sprague) Sprague
 Nautilocalyx hirtiflorus (Spruce ex Hanst.) Sprague
 Nautilocalyx kohlerioides (Leeuwenb.) Wiehler
 Nautilocalyx lucianii (Linden & E. Fourn.) Wiehler
 Nautilocalyx lynchii (Hook. f.) Sprague
 Nautilocalyx maguirei L.E.Skog & Steyerm.
 Nautilocalyx melittifolius (L.) Wiehler
 Nautilocalyx membranaceus (C.V.Morton) Wiehler
 Nautilocalyx mimuloides (Benth.) C.V.Morton
 Nautilocalyx mulfordii Wiehler
 Nautilocalyx pallidus (Sprague) Sprague
 Nautilocalyx panamensis (Seem.) Seem.
 Nautilocalyx peltatus (C.V. Morton) Wiehler
 Nautilocalyx pemphidius L.E.Skog
 Nautilocalyx peruvianus Wiehler
 Nautilocalyx picturatus L.E. Skog
 Nautilocalyx pictus (Hook.) Sprague
 Nautilocalyx porphyrotrichus (Leeuwenb.) Wiehler
 Nautilocalyx punctatus Wiehler
 Nautilocalyx purpurascens Kriebel
 Nautilocalyx resioides (Leeuwenb.) Wiehler
 Nautilocalyx silvaticus (Cuatrec.) Wiehler
 Nautilocalyx speciosus Wiehler
 Nautilocalyx urticifolius (Leeuwenb.) Wiehler
 Nautilocalyx villosus (Kunth & C.D.Bouché) Sprague
 Nautilocalyx vinosus Wiehler
 Nautilocalyx whitei Rusby

References

Other sources
 USDA Germplasm Resources Information Network (GRIN) entry
 Brummitt, R. K. 1993. Report of the Committee for Spermatophyta: 39. Taxon 42:878.
 Feuillet, C. & L. E. Skog. 1990. (991) Proposal to conserve 7857a Nautilocalyx against Centrosolenia (Gesneriaceae: Gesnerioideae). Taxon 39:691–693.

 
Gesneriaceae genera
Taxonomy articles created by Polbot